Madden (also known as Madden Raparees ) is a small village and townland in County Armagh, Northern Ireland. It is within the Armagh City, Banbridge and Craigavon Borough Council area. It has a population of around 200 people. (2001 Census: 105 people)

History 
The current Roman Catholic church at Madden was built in 1998, replacing an earlier building. The Church of Ireland church of St John's, Derrynoose is also in the townland of Madden. The glebe-house for that church was erected by the Reverend James Jones. and was described as "large and handsome". It is now a roofless ruin.

Education 
St. Joseph's Primary School
Modern newly built school

Sport 
The main sports in Madden are Gaelic football and Camogie and also played is road bowling. The local GAA club, Madden Raparees GAC (Ropairí na Madan), plays in county competitions at Senior level.

The road bowling club contains a number of All-Ireland champions at various grades.

References 

Lewis's Topographical Dictionary, 1837

Villages in County Armagh
Townlands of County Armagh